is a former Japanese football player.

Playing career
Suzuki was born in Tokyo on September 15, 1968. After graduating from Kokushikan University, he joined Toshiba in 1991. He played as offensive midfielder and forward. In 1994, he moved to newly was promoted to J1 League club, Júbilo Iwata. From 1994, he played many matches instead Masashi Nakayama and Salvatore Schillaci left the games for injury. However he could hardly play in the match from 1996 and retired end of 1997 season.

Club statistics

References

External links

j-league.or.jp

1968 births
Living people
Horikoshi High School alumni
Kokushikan University alumni
Association football people from Tokyo
Japanese footballers
Japan Soccer League players
J1 League players
Japan Football League (1992–1998) players
Hokkaido Consadole Sapporo players
Júbilo Iwata players
Association football midfielders